Pedro Guanikeyu Torres, also known as Peter Guanikeyu Torres, is a Taino-identifying civil rights activist, tribal leader, educator, language teacher, tribal historian, actor and a Taino Indian Nationalist of Puerto Rico.

Academic preparation
Torres's academic background includes studies in Cultural Anthropology, Puerto Rican studies, Art and Latin American studies. Torres graduated from Rutgers University, the State University of New Jersey at Livingston College in June 1977.

Cultural activism

In the late 1960s and early 1970s Torres did research aimed at documenting Taino artifacts and history through the CPI Comite Pro Indigenismo. In the mid 1970s Torres had translated the very first theater script from the Spanish language to the Taino language as a former Actor and member of El Grupo Guazabara (The Guazabara Theater Group). In 1993 he founded the Taino Inter-Tribal Council (TITC, Inc.), a not-for-profit Taino cultural-educational organization. He worked at various archaeological sites, including Puerto De Tierra in the 1970s. For over five (5) decades and many years, Torres has advocated the reclaiming and repatriation of artifacts pertaining to the past Pre-Columbian historical territory of the principal regional Chief Orocobix of the Jatibonicu Taino tribe, a tribe located in the central mountain region of Puerto Rico. It should be mentioned that Torres is credited and recognized as being a Taino Civil Rights activist and one of the original founding Fathers of the 1968 Taino Indian Movement of Puerto Rico.

He is an activist for the official government recognition of the Taino people and his unrecognized Jatibonicu Taino tribal community of Puerto Rico and in New Jersey. As tribal leader, Torres is politically active in Taino tribal council government, national and international political affairs.

Often known as Don Pedro or Chief Guanikeyu, in 1996 Torres called for the "Taino national unity of all the Taino Indian people.  In 2000, Torres represented the Jatibonicu Taino Tribal Nation before the U.S. Census Bureau. As part of his Taino tribal activism he has written various papers and articles on the relevancy of Taino culture and the history of Tainos in Puerto Rico, Florida and adjacent areas.

Torres also performed as a Taino language teacher and researcher. As a tribal leader, he conducted the traditional Taino Guatiao (naming ceremony) and has bestowed the Taino name on many modern Taino people today. He also promoted the Taino language when he was chosen to name a crater on planet Venus that he named Nanichi "My Love or My Heart" in the year 2000.

Resignation and subsequent return
Due to failing health, in 2001, Guanikeyu Torres withdrew from the leading role of his Taino tribal community and assumed the post of tribal elder.

References

External links 
 
 Video on Taino History on YouTube
 Jatibonicu Taino People site

1951 births
American civil rights activists
Living people
Puerto Rican people of Taíno descent